Liszki may refer to the following places:
Liszki, Lesser Poland Voivodeship (south Poland)
Liszki, Łódź Voivodeship (central Poland)
Liszki, Masovian Voivodeship (east-central Poland)
Liszki, Warmian-Masurian Voivodeship (north Poland)